Antonio Salvador is the name of:

António Salvador (athlete) (born 1966), Portuguese long-distance runner
Antonio Salvador (cyclist) (born 1968), Spanish cyclist
Antonio Rodríguez Salvador (born 1960), poet, fiction writer, dramatist and essayist